Meaker is a surname. Notable people with the surname include:

Emeline Meaker, first woman legally executed by the state of Vermont
Marijane Meaker, American novelist and short story writer
Michael Meaker (born 1971), Welsh footballer and coach
Stuart Meaker, English cricketer

Fictional characters:
Harold Meaker and his wife Ethel from the BBC television series Rentaghost